Umaru Tafidan Argungu (born 1 May 1959) was elected Senator for Kebbi North constituency of Kebbi State, Nigeria, taking office on 29 May 2007. He is a member of the People's Democratic Party (PDP).

Argungu obtained an M.Sc in Transport Studies.
Before election to the Senate, he was General Manager, Special Duties, Nigerian Ports Authority and a Company Chairman.
After election, he was appointed to committees on Sports, Public Accounts, Privatization, Marine Transport, Environment, Communications and Air Force.

References

Living people
1959 births
Kebbi State
Peoples Democratic Party members of the Senate (Nigeria)
21st-century Nigerian politicians